Emanuele Rotondo (born 26 November 1975) is an Italian retired basketball player. Standing at 194 cm (6 ft 4 in), Rotondo usually plays as point guard. He played sixteen seasons for Dinamo Sassari, which co-retired his number 12 along with Travis Diener who wore the same number.

References

1975 births
Living people
Italian men's basketball players
Dinamo Sassari players
Basket Livorno players
Point guards